Myrtle E. Dorsey served as chancellor at St. Louis Community College from 2011 to 2013.

Education and background
Dorsey attended Morgan State University, where she earned her bachelor's and master's degrees. She earned her doctorate from the University of Texas at Austin in the Community College Leadership program.

Career
She began her career in higher education as a Reading Specialist  at Bowie State University and the University of Maryland.

Howard Community College, Maryland
In 1981, she began working at Howard Community College in Columbia, Maryland, where she held progressively responsible positions, including as Director of Special Services and Associate Dean of Students.

Baltimore City Community College
In 1991, Dorsey moved to Baltimore City Community College, where she served as vice-president of Student Affairs, responsible for all aspects of student services. She oversaw the institutional advancement areas including the Foundation , alumni affairs and grants.

Georgia Perimeter College
Dorsey moved to Georgia Perimeter College as Vice President of Student Affairs and Institutional Advancement in 1996. This campus was one of a multi-campus system and had 16,000 credit and 22,000 non-credit students.

Technical and Community College, Cincinnati
In 2000, she transferred to the Technical and Community College in Cincinnati as Executive Vice President. She had full responsibility for the college operation functions with the President focused on external partnerships.

Baton Rouge Community College
In 2002, Dorsey was appointed chancellor of Baton Rouge Community College (BRCC). She led the college through its first Southern Association of Colleges and Schools (SACS) accreditation and received approval to offer financial aid at the college.  BRCC is currently the third-largest institute of higher learning in Louisiana.

St. Louis Community College
In 2011, Dorsey was appointed chancellor of St. Louis Community College. She served as the chief executive officer of a multi-campus college system consisting of four campuses, two satellite centers, and two centers focused on workforce needs. St. Louis Community College is the largest community college district in Missouri and the state's second-largest higher education system. The college annually serves more than 81,000 students through credit courses, continuing education and workforce development programs.

In September 2013 the board of trustees chose not to renew her contract due in part to a report prepared by the St. Louis law firm of Armstrong Teasdale LLP on the handling of an incident in April in which a student was attacked at the college's Meramec campus. On April 18, student Jevon Mallory was allegedly caught choking fellow student Blythe Grupe in a women's bathroom on the Meramec campus. Despite Mallory's admission that he was attempting to “withdraw her from life,” campus officials released him within hours, didn't alert the campus to the threat, and addressed the assault only after the victim went public. A report by Armstrong Teasdale said the way it was handled showed “a lack in leadership and management from key personnel at the district and campus levels.” The college's board of trustees hired the law firm to investigate after a community-wide furor erupted over the handling of the assault.

References

External links
North Harris College website
Goldman Sachs website (corporate citizenship)
Dorsey biodata at Findarticles.com

Living people
People from Baton Rouge, Louisiana
People from Prince George's County, Maryland
University of Texas at Austin College of Education alumni
Bowie State University faculty
Year of birth missing (living people)
Place of birth missing (living people)